Pseudoboletia maculata is a species of sea urchin. It is found in the western central Pacific Ocean. It is known in Indonesia, the tropical eastern Indian Ocean, and on the Great Barrier Reef. This species is reef-associated, and lives at depths of between 10 and 82 metres.

References

External links
 

Toxopneustidae
Animals described in 1869